is a Buddhist temple of the Shingon sect located in Gifu, Gifu Prefecture, Japan. It is the seventeenth of the Mino Thirty-three Kannon.

History
The Temple was founded in 746, under the orders of Emperor Shōmu. The original temple was destroyed in 1590 by a large fire, but was rebuilt during the Edo period's Genbun and Hōreki eras. The rebuilt temple is still extant today.

See also 
 For an explanation of terms concerning Japanese Buddhism, Japanese Buddhist art, and Japanese Buddhist temple architecture, see the Glossary of Japanese Buddhism.
List of National Treasures of Japan (crafts-others)

References

Images 

Buildings and structures in Gifu
Buddhist temples in Gifu Prefecture
Kōyasan Shingon temples